The Palestinian Paralympic Committee is the National Paralympic Committee of Palestine.

In 2010, the Palestinian Paralympic Committee and the global aid agency Mercy Corps, started a 2-year program, funded by the European Union (EU). The 533,000 euro (approximately, 650,000 US dollar) programme to empower Palestinian youth with disabilities, follow the research of the Sport for Development and Peace International Working Group (SDP IWG).

See also 
 Palestine at the Paralympics
 Palestine Olympic Committee

References

External links 
Palestine (IPC)

Parasports organizations
National Paralympic Committees
Para
Palestine at the Paralympics
Disability organizations based in the State of Palestine